With a Little Help from My Friends is the second ABC album for jazz singer Lu Elliott. It was released in 1968 and featured the songs "With a Little Help from My Friends", "The Very Thought of You" and "If I Were a Bell".

Background
This album which was Elliott's second album for ABC was released a short time after her first which was Sings Way Out from Down Under. It was released in 1968 on ABC ABCS 637.

Reviews
In 1968, Stereo Review referred to the album as a recording of special merit. The album also received a good review from Billboard in the magazine's July 20, 1968 issue. It said that she was a gal loaded with talent which vibrated in the grooves of the disk.

Track listing
 A side
 "With a Little Help from My Friends" - 2:35
 "The Very Thought of You" - 2:14
 "My Romance" - 2:32
 "I'll Show Them All" - 3:00
 "Our Love Will Last Forever" - 2:18
 "On Green Dolphin Street" - 2:36
 B side
 "If I Were a Bell" - 2:45
 "Don't Love Me" - 2:54
 "I Know No" - 3:06
 "Treat Me Good" - 3:04
 "Don't Go to Strangers" - 2:10

References

External links 
</ref>

1968 albums
Lu Elliott albums
ABC Records albums